WREF (97.7 FM) is a radio station licensed to Sebree, Kentucky, United States, serving Hopkins and Webster counties, as well as the greater Evansville, Indiana, area. The station is owned by Henson Media, Inc.

The station has been assigned the call letters WWKY by the Federal Communications Commission since July 14, 2004. WWKY was originally licensed to Winchester, Kentucky, circa 1952, and operated on the AM band at 1380 kHz. In December 1983, the station was sold to the owners of WFMI, which was the competing FM station in that city at the time. The new owners subsequently changing WWKY's format from adult contemporary to a specialized news format, geared towards Kentucky's horse industry, with a call sign change to WHRS. From 1989 to 2001, the call letters WWKY were assigned to Louisville, Kentucky at 790 kHz, which had formerly been WAKY. WWKY started in the Louisville market as a country station. By 1991, however, the format was more a mix of country and news/talk. Music was dropped entirely in 2001, and the station changed its call sign to WXXA. On March 27, 2017, WWKY went silent. On April 13, 2017, WWKY changed callsigns to WREF. The station resumed broadcasting June 1, 2017 as ESPN 97.7, The Ref.

Programming

Past Programming

Rick Stevens was heard on weekdays from 9 until noon.

Howdy-FM covered local news of Madisonville and Hopkins County with Boyce Tate.

WWKY was the sports voice of Webster County High School, the University of Kentucky and the Tennessee Titans.

Current Programming

WREF now broadcasts ESPN Radio and a local sports talk show called "All About Sports" on weekdays. WREF also broadcasts local high school sporting events along with local collegiate sports

References

External links

REF (FM)
Radio stations established in 1952
1952 establishments in Kentucky
ESPN Radio stations
Webster County, Kentucky